The 1989 Hawaii Rainbow Warriors football team represented the University of Hawaiʻi at Mānoa in the Western Athletic Conference during the 1989 NCAA Division I-A football season. In their third season under head coach Bob Wagner, the Rainbow Warriors compiled a 9–3–1 record.

Schedule

Personnel

Season summary

BYU

References

Hawaii
Hawaii Rainbow Warriors football seasons
Hawaii Rainbow Warriors football